The John Gore Organization (JGO), formerly known as Key Brand Entertainment (KBE), is a producer and distributor of live theater in North America, as well as an e-commerce company, focused on theater. KBE was founded in the UK in 2004 by 14-time Tony Award-winning Producer John Gore who is the company's Chairman, CEO and Owner.

History 
The company is a successor to a number of theatrical production and distribution companies acquired through acquisition or merger. These include: Livent, Clear Channel Entertainment, PACE Theatrical Group, Magicworks, and others. As such it retains interests in numerous Broadway productions and various related rights. The company was amalgamated into Broadway Across America under Clear Channel Communication's ownership.

Broadway Across America became a business unit of Live Nation, Inc. following the spin-off of Live Nation from Clear Channel Communications on December 25, 2005. Clear Channel had acquired the assets of SFX Entertainment, which was owned primarily by Robert F.X. Sillerman, and principally consisted of live concert venues and amphitheaters devoted primarily to rock music in February 2000. 
 
SFX Entertainment, in turn, was founded by Sillerman in order to "roll up" businesses associated with live entertainment, principally rock music. He began by acquiring Delsner/Slater Concerts in 1996 and a number of acquisitions followed rapidly thereafter. Sillerman's entry into theater began with the acquisition of PACE Theatrical Group in October 1997. In September 1998, SFX acquired Magicworks Entertainment, Inc. This Miami-based company promoted concerts and managed touring events such as magician David Copperfield and musicals Jekyll & Hyde and Evita. It had been a partner of PACE unit PACE Theatricals for some time. PACE, in turn, was controlled by Texas-based theater veteran Allen Becker. Also acquired was production company American Artists, which controlled several theaters in the Boston area including the historic Colonial Theater. Magicworks had been controlled by Lee D. Marshall and Joe Marsh (Lee and Marsh later reunited in the company Magic Arts & Entertainment). The summer of 1999 saw court approval granted for a purchase of the bankrupt Livent (then controlled by Canadian entrepreneur Garth Drabinsky and CAA founder Mike Ovitz), a deal that had been initiated a year earlier. Livent, once one of the premier theatrical production companies, owned such touring shows as Ragtime and Fosse, as well as a number of venues in Canada and the United States. Its bankruptcy had been attributed to widespread accounting fraud. In early 2000 SFX acquired Jujamcyn Productions of Minneapolis, a touring theatrical production company. SFX already owned half of Jujamcyn, acquired through PACE Entertainment.

On December 16, 2010, Key Brand completed the acquisition of Theater Direct International from Hollywood Media Corp. for an announced price of $43.1 million in cash and other consideration, Theater Direct owned and operated the content-driven e-commerce websites Broadway.com, Theater.com, Theatre.com, and Theatre.co.uk. In May 2012, Key Brand completed the acquisition of BroadwayBox.com, a website for discount theater tickets in New York. That December, Key Brand completed the acquisition of Group Sales Box Office (GSBO), the a group-sales ticket agency.

In December 2020, individuals who purchased their tickets from a John Gore Organization platform, including Broadway.com and Broadway Across America were given the option to donate the value of their unused tickets to Broadway Cares/Equity Fights AIDS and the COVID-19 Emergency Assistance Fund, as an effort to offer relief for shows and theater fans affected by the cancellation of events forced by the COVID-19 pandemic, raising more than $2.6 million.

In 2020,  the Gore family introduced a social and web programming to raise awareness of the anti-racism movement, reaching upwards of 3 million Broadway fans.

Assets 
The company's assets include:

 Broadway Across America (BAA) a major theater touring organization in North America acquired in 2008. With over 400,000 season subscribers, BAA has earned 248 Tony Awards in over 35 years of producing and investing in Broadway shows. BAA owns and/or operates five theaters in Boston, Baltimore, and Minneapolis.
 Broadway.com, the ticketing site, with the 2010 acquisition of Theatre Direct NY. In 2018, Broadway.com won a New York Emmy for its production of At The Tonys with Imogen Lloyd Webber for WCBS-TV. Broadway.com also hosts and presents the Broadway.com Audience Choice Awards annually.
 Group Sales Box Office, merged with Broadway.com/Groups in 2012.
 BroadwayBox.com, the top source for Broadway discounts was acquired in 2013.
 The Broadway Channel, the video content brand acquired in 2015.

Philanthropically, JGO has supported The Arthur Miller Foundation with a grant to provide theater educators in NYC Public Schools. In 2017, JGO raised $500,000 for Hurricane Maria relief in Puerto Rico by producing a benefit performance of Thornton Wilder’s Our Town starring Scarlett Johansson, Robert Downey Jr. and Chris Evans. It was announced in September 2018 that JGO pledged $100,000 to the T. Fellowship at Columbia University, a program that fosters new creative producers. In April 2021, the John Gore Organization became a founding partner in The Theatre Leadership Project to train and mentor a new generation of Black theater industry leaders. In January 2022, JGO launched the Black Theatre Coalition/Broadway Across America Fellowship program, the first national Broadway fellowship program designed to provide an introduction to the Broadway industry for aspiring BIPOC theater professionals.

Awards 
As the John Gore Organization, the company was awarded several awards including Tony Awards, Drama Desk Awards, :

As the John Gore Organization
 Moulin Rouge! The Musical - 2020 Tony Award for Best Musical 
 Special Event Coverage (other than news and sports) - 2020 New York Emmy Award At the Tonys with Imogen Lloyd Webber 
 Broadway Profiles, Magazine Program (series) - 2020 New York Emmy Award 
 Oklahoma! - 2019 Tony Award for Best Revival of a Musical
The Prom (musical) - 2019 Drama Desk Award for Outstanding Musical
The Waverly Gallery - 2019 Drama Desk Award for Outstanding Revival of a Play
 The Band's Visit – 2018 Tony Award for Best Musical
 Angels in America – 2018 Tony Award for Best Revival of a Play; Drama Desk Award
 Dear Evan Hansen – 2017 Tony Award for Best Musical
 Hello, Dolly! – 2017 Tony Award for Best Revival of a Musical; Drama Desk Award
 A View From The Bridge – 2016 Tony Award for Best Revival of a Play; Drama Desk Award

As Broadway Across America
 The Humans – 2016 Tony Award for Best Play; Drama Desk Award
 Pippin – 2013 Tony Award for Best Revival of a Musical; Drama Desk Award
 The Gershwins' Porgy and Bess – 2012 Tony Award for Best Revival of a Musical
 War Horse – 2011 Tony Award for Best Play; Drama Desk Award
 Memphis — 2010 Tony Award for Best New Musical; Drama Desk Award
 La Cage Aux Folles — 2010 Tony Award for Best Revival of a Musical; Drama Desk Award
 Hair — 2009 Tony Award for Best Revival of a Musical; Drama Desk Award
 Spring Awakening — 2009 Olivier Award for Best New Musical in London
 Passing Strange — 2009 Drama Desk Award for Best New Play
 Boeing-Boeing — 2008 Tony Award for Best Revival of a Play; Drama Desk Award

Previously and under different names
 Spamalot — 2005 Tony Award for Best New Musical (as Clear Channel)
 Hairspray — 2003 Tony Award for Best New Musical (as Clear Channel)
 The Producers — 2002 Tony Award for Best New Musical (as Clear Channel)
 Fosse — 1999 Tony Award for Best New Musical (as Livent)
 Chicago — 1997 Tony Award for Best Revival of a Musical (as Pace Theatrical)
 Showboat — 1995 Tony Award for Best Revival of a Musical (as Livent)
 Kiss of the Spiderwoman — 1993 Tony Award for Best New Musical (as Livent)
 Fiddler on the Roof — 1991 Tony Award for Best Revival of a Musical (as Pace Theatrical)
 Gypsy — 1990 Tony Award for Best Revival of a Musical (as Pace Theatrical)
 Jerome Robbins Broadway — 1989 Tony Award for Best New Musical (as Pace Theatrical)

References

External links 
 

E-commerce
Theatre companies